Bridge in Clinton Township is a historic Pratt through truss bridge located in Clinton Township, Venango County, Pennsylvania. It was built by the Smith Bridge Company of Toledo, Ohio in 1887.  It measures  and crosses the Scrubgrass Creek.

It was listed on the National Register of Historic Places in 1988.

References

Road bridges on the National Register of Historic Places in Pennsylvania
Bridges completed in 1887
Truss bridges in the United States
Bridges in Venango County, Pennsylvania
National Register of Historic Places in Venango County, Pennsylvania